William Alexander Mackinnon  (1813 – 14 September 1903) was elected the whig MP for Rye on 10 July 1852 but the result was declared void as a result of "treating".  There was a question of £220 left behind a sofa cushion  at the Red Lion to pay for a dinner.  At the resulting bye-election the seat was taken by his father.  At the next election he was elected MP for Lymington which he held until 1868 but he never spoke in parliament. He was the 34th Chief of the Clan Mackinnon. He was educated at St John's College, Cambridge.

Marriage
He married Miss Willes on 25 April 1846. Mackinnon died aged 90 at his home Acrise Place near Folkestone, Kent.

References

External links 
 

1813 births
1903 deaths
Members of the Parliament of the United Kingdom for English constituencies
Alumni of St John's College, Cambridge
UK MPs 1852–1857
UK MPs 1857–1859
UK MPs 1859–1865
UK MPs 1865–1868
Deputy Lieutenants of Kent
William Alexander